Microphidias bacteriopis is a moth in the family Xyloryctidae, and the only species in the genus Microphidias. The species and genus were both described by Edward Meyrick in 1937 and are found in South Africa.

The wingspan is about 15 mm. The forewings are white with the discal stigmata small and blackish and with a slight blackish mark on the costal edge near the apex. The hindwings are grey-whitish.

References

Endemic moths of South Africa
Xyloryctidae
Monotypic moth genera
Xyloryctidae genera
Taxa named by Edward Meyrick